José Quiles Brotons (born 19 October 1997) is a Spanish boxer. He competed in the men's featherweight event at the 2020 Summer Olympics held in Tokyo, Japan.

In 2019, he competed in the men's 56 kg event at the European Games held in Minsk, Belarus.

References

External links
 
 
 

1997 births
Living people
People from Elda
Sportspeople from the Province of Alicante
Spanish male boxers
European Games competitors for Spain
Boxers at the 2019 European Games
Olympic boxers of Spain
Boxers at the 2020 Summer Olympics
21st-century Spanish people